Izyaslav III Davidovich (1115?-1162), Prince (Kniaz') of Chernigov (1152–1154, 1155–1157) and Grand Prince of Kiev (Kyiv, 1154–1155, 1157–1158, 1162).  He was the son of Davyd Sviatoslavich of Chernigov.

References

Rurik dynasty
Grand Princes of Kiev
1162 deaths
12th-century princes in Kievan Rus'
Year of birth unknown
Eastern Orthodox monarchs